Allen Lyman Bartlett Jr. (born September 20, 1929) is an Episcopal priest who became coadjutor bishop in the Episcopal Diocese of Pennsylvania, the fourth largest in the country. He succeeded Bishop Lyman Ogilby as the diocese's 14th bishop until his retirement. Since his retirement, he has assisted in his former diocese (where he continues to live) as well as other dioceses, including the Episcopal Diocese of Washington (2001-2004).

Early life, education and family life
Born in Alabama, Bartlett graduated from the University of the South in 1951. He worked as a reporter and served in the United States Navy, where he was stationed in Hawaii as a Lieutenant (junior grade). He attended the Virginia Theological Seminary, which awarded him a Master of Divinity degree. He later received D.D. degrees from both institutions. He remains married to the former Jerriette Kohlmeier

Career
Upon being ordained a priest in 1959, Rev. Bartlett served at parishes in Alabama and West Virginia, including as rector of historic Zion Church in Charles Town, West Virginia from 1961 to 1970. As Dean of Christ Church Cathedral (Louisville, Kentucky) from 1970 to 1986, he formed an inner-city street ministry to serve the poor and homeless, as well as facilitated civic, ecclesiastical and artistic events in the cathedral.

He moved to Philadelphia in 1986 to become coadjutor to bishop Lyman Ogilby, and succeeded him as bishop. Approximately 6500 people and 17 bishops led by Presiding Bishop Edmund L. Browning and bishop Ogilby attended his consecration at the Philadelphia Civic Center. While the controversy over ordination of women calmed somewhat, that concerning race relations continued. Rt.Rev. Bartlett also became embroiled in controversy concerning the ordination of homosexuals.

Since his retirement, bishop Bartlett has assisted in the Episcopal Diocese of Washington (2001-2004) (initially with congregations resisting bishop pro tempore Jane Holmes Dixon and later under Bishop John Chane, as well as participated in the Pennsylvania diocese's oral history project.

References

1929 births
Living people
20th-century Anglican bishops in the United States
Religious leaders from Alabama
American Episcopal priests
Place of birth missing (living people)
United States Navy officers
Sewanee: The University of the South alumni
Virginia Theological Seminary alumni
Episcopal bishops of Pennsylvania